Babina is a genus of frogs in the family Ranidae from south-eastern and eastern Asia. Formerly, Babina was considered as a subgenus of Rana.

Species
The following species are recognised in the genus Babina:
 Babina holsti (Boulenger, 1892) – Holst's frog
 Babina subaspera (Barbour, 1908) – Otton frog

References

 
True frogs
Amphibian genera
Frogs of Asia
Taxa named by Joseph Cheesman Thompson